Khagendra Nath Dasgupta was an independence activist, minister in the West Bengal government, Leader of the Opposition in West Bengal Vidhan Sabha and Member of the Lok Sabha.

Early life
Khagendra Nath Dasgupta was born on 6 July 1898 at Jalpaiguri to Ishan Chandra  Dasgupta. He graduated from Rajshahi College. He joined a revolutionary party early in life and was a member of it from 1913 to 1920. After the special session of the Congress in Kolkata, he joined the non-cooperation movement in 1920. He organised the Congress Party in Jalpiaguri and was sent to jail several times.
 
He was elected Commissioner of Japaiguri Municipality in 1924 and thrice thereafter. In the 1937 Bengal elections, Khagendra Nath Dasgupta won as a Congress candidate from the Jalpaiguri-cum-Siliguri constituency.

Post-Independence
He was elected to the West Bengal Vidhan Sabha from Jalpaiguri in 1951, 1957, 1962 and 1967.

He was Minister, Public Works and Buildings, in 1952, Public Works and Building and Housing in 1957, Public Works in 1962, and for a short duration in 1968. He was leader of the opposition during United Front regime in 1967.

He won the election to the 6th Lok Sabha as a Janata Party candidate (recorded as independent in election records) in 1977.
He retired from active politics in 1980. He died on 15 June 1985.

References

West Bengal MLAs 1951–1957
West Bengal MLAs 1957–1962
West Bengal MLAs 1962–1967
West Bengal MLAs 1967–1969
Indian National Congress politicians
Dasgupta, Khagendra Nath
Lok Sabha members from West Bengal
People from Jalpaiguri district
1985 deaths
Leaders of the Opposition in West Bengal
Janata Party politicians
Independent politicians in India
India MPs 1977–1979